San Bernardo is a village in Puebla, Mexico.

References

 
Populated places in Puebla